Vertumnus and Pomona may refer to:

 Vertumnus and Pomona (Claudel), a 1905 sculpture by Camille Claudel
 Vertumnus and Pomona (Melzi), a painting by Francesco Melzi completed c. 1518–1522
 Vertumnus and Pomona (Pontormo), a fresco painted by Jacopo Pontormo in the Medici country villa at Poggio a Caiano, Tuscany, Italy

See also
 Vertumnus, the god of seasons, change, and plant growth in Roman mythology
 Pomona (mythology), a goddess of fruitful abundance in Roman mythology